Clairmont Park is a public, urban park in Apex, North Carolina. Located at 801 E. Chatham St in Apex, the park is a short distance to the east of downtown Apex.

The 1.5 acre park contains a picnic shelter and grill, a basketball court, and a youth playground (ages 5–12).

References

Apex, North Carolina
Urban public parks
Parks in Wake County, North Carolina
Tourist attractions in Apex, North Carolina